Maneca is a butterfly genus in the family Lycaenidae. It is monotypic, containing only the species Maneca bhotea, the slate royal. This is found in Assam and Yunnan (M. b. unnanensis Yoshino, 2001 sic)

References

Iolaini
Lycaenidae genera
Taxa named by Lionel de Nicéville
Monotypic butterfly genera